Tirachoidea westwoodii is a species of stick insect in the order Phasmatodea. It is endemic to India, Myanmar, Thailand and Vietnam.

References 

Phasmatidae
Insects described in 1875
Phasmatodea of Malesia